Szczeliniec Wielki (historically) is the highest peak (919 m) of the Table Mountains in the Table Mountains National Park in Lower Silesia, Poland. It belongs to the Crown of Polish Mountains and is one of the biggest tourist attractions of the Sudetes, the landscape reserve and viewing terraces with panoramic views of the Sudetes. The highest point is a rock called "Armchair of Great Grandfather" (pl: Fotel Pradziada).

References

Mountains of Poland